Kaz, Inc. is a Marlborough, Massachusetts-based manufacturer and distributor of health care products.

History 
Max Katzman invented the first electric vaporizer (original U.S. patent no. 1,628,784, issued May 17, 1927) and, in 1926, he founded Kaz, Incorporated to manufacture and market it.

The expansion of the company – from a family business to a company designing, developing and marketing hundreds of healthcare and home environment products worldwide – came through research and development, acquisitions and licensing agreements.

For more than 80 years, members of the Katzman family owned and managed Kaz. In 1956, founder Lawrence (Larry) Katzman succeeded his father, founder Max Katzman. In addition to serving as Kaz’ second CEO, Larry was also a Palma d’Oro winning cartoonist best known for drawing Nellie Nifty, RN for a series of books and greeting cards.  Richard Katzman succeeded his father, Larry, as CEO in 1997.

In 2006, Julien Mininberg became Kaz, Inc.’s first President outside the Katzman family. He became CEO in 2010. Helen of Troy acquired Kaz, Inc. in 2010, and it continues to operate as a subsidiary. Julien Mininberg remained the company's CEO until 2014, when he was appointed CEO of Helen of Troy.

References

External links 
 Kaz.com
 HOTUS.com

Privately held companies based in Massachusetts
Home appliance manufacturers of the United States
Companies based in Middlesex County, Massachusetts
Marlborough, Massachusetts
Manufacturing companies established in 1926
Health care companies established in 1926
American companies established in 1926
1926 establishments in Massachusetts
Helen of Troy Limited
2011 mergers and acquisitions